The 2013–14 Golden State Warriors season was the 68th season of the franchise in the National Basketball Association (NBA), and the 52nd anniversary of their time in the San Francisco Bay Area. They finished the regular season with a record of 51–31, clinching the sixth seed in the Western Conference. In the playoffs, the Warriors faced the Los Angeles Clippers in the first round of the playoffs, and lost in seven games.

Following the season, Mark Jackson was dismissed as the Warriors head coach, and Steve Kerr became the new head coach. This was the last time the Warriors did not make the NBA Finals until 2020.

Draft

The Warriors did not have a pick in the 2013 NBA draft.

Pre-season

|- style="background:#fcc;"
| 1
| October 5
| @ L.A. Lakers
| 
| Klay Thompson (26)
| Andrew Bogut (12)
| David Lee (5)
| Citizens Business Bank Arena6,946
| 0–1
|- style="background:#cfc;"
| 2
| October 7
| Sacramento
| 
| Stephen Curry (23)
| David Lee (13)
| Curry, Douglas (6)
| Oracle Arena17,821
| 1–1
|- style="background:#fcc;"
| 3
| October 8
| @ Utah
| 
| Marreese Speights (13)
| Andrew Bogut (10)
| Stephen Curry (3)
| EnergySolutions Arena19,025
| 1–2
|- style="background:#cfc;"
| 4
| October 15
| @ L.A. Lakers
| 
| David Lee (31)
| Andrew Bogut (14)
| Stephen Curry (7)
| MasterCard Center17,114
| 2–2
|- style="background:#cfc;"
| 5
| October 18
| L.A. Lakers
| 
| Klay Thompson (25)
| Andre Iguodala (7)
| Andre Iguodala (14)
| Mercedes-Benz Arena17,482
| 3–2
|- style="background:#fcc;"
| 6
| October 23
| @ Sacramento
| 
| Stephen Curry (24)
| Bogut, O'Neal (7)
| Iguodala, Curry (6)
| Sleep Train Arena12,260
| 3–3
|- style="background:#fcc;"
| 7
| October 24
| Portland
| 
| Stephen Curry (17)
| Andrew Bogut (9)
| Stephen Curry (6)
| Oracle Arena18,307
| 3–4

Regular season

Standings

Game log

|- style="background:#cfc;"
| 1
| October 30
| L.A. Lakers
| 
| Klay Thompson (38)
| Lee, Bogut, Speights (8)
| Stephen Curry (6)
| Oracle Arena19,596
| 1–0
|- style="background:#fcc;"
| 2
| October 31
| @ L.A. Clippers
| 
| Stephen Curry (38)
| Draymond Green (8)
| Andre Iguodala (11)
| Staples Center19,060
| 1–1

|- style="background:#cfc;"
| 3
| November 2
| Sacramento
| 
| Klay Thompson (27)
| David Lee (12)
| Stephen Curry (12)
| Oracle Arena19,596
| 2–1
|- style="background:#cfc;"
| 4
| November 4
| @ Philadelphia
| 
| Andre Iguodala (32)
| Stephen Curry (10)
| Stephen Curry (12)
| Wells Fargo Center11,089
| 3–1
|- style="background:#cfc;"
| 5
| November 6
| @ Minnesota
| 
| Klay Thompson (30)
| David Lee (15)
| Stephen Curry (7)
| Target Center15,559
| 4–1
|- style="background:#fcc;"
| 6
| November 8
| @ San Antonio
| 
| Toney Douglas (21)
| Andrew Bogut (13)
| Andrew Bogut (5)
| AT&T Center18,581
| 4–2
|- style="background:#fcc;"
| 7
| November 9
| @ Memphis
| 
| Stephen Curry (22)
| David Lee (9)
| Stephen Curry (5)
| FedExForum16,989
| 4–3
|- style="background:#cfc;"
| 8
| November 12
| Detroit
| 
| Stephen Curry (25)
| Lee & Bogut (9)
| Andre Iguodala (11)
| Oracle Arena19,596
| 5–3
|- style="background:#cfc;"
| 9
| November 14
| Oklahoma City
| 
| Klay Thompson (27)
| Andrew Bogut (7)
| Iguodala & Curry (9)
| Oracle Arena19,596
| 6–3
|- style="background:#cfc;"
| 10
| November 16
| Utah
| 
| Klay Thompson (25)
| Andrew Bogut (11)
| Stephen Curry (11)
| Oracle Arena19,596
| 7–3
|- style="background:#cfc;"
| 11
| November 18
| @ Utah
| 
| Stephen Curry (22)
| David Lee (14)
| Stephen Curry (8)
| EnergySolutions Arena16,051
| 8–3
|- style="background:#fcc;"
| 12
| November 20
| Memphis
| 
| Klay Thompson (21)
| Andrew Bogut (14)
| Andre Iguodala (14)
| Oracle Arena19,596
| 8–4
|- style="background:#fcc;"
| 13
| November 22
| @ L.A. Lakers
| 
| David Lee (21)
| Lee & Bogut (13)
| Andre Iguodala (6)
| Staples Center18,997
| 8–5
|- style="background:#fcc;"
| 14
| November 23
| Portland
| 
| Klay Thompson (30)
| Lee & Bogut (12)
| Stephen Curry (11)
| Oracle Arena19,596
| 8–6
|- style="background:#cfc;"
| 15
| November 26
| @ New Orleans
| 
| Klay Thompson (22)
| Jermaine O'Neal (8)
| Stephen Curry (9)
| New Orleans Arena15,330
| 9–6
|- style="background:#fcc;"
| 16
| November 27
| @ Dallas
| 
| Stephen Curry (29)
| David Lee (12)
| Stephen Curry (8)
| American Airlines Center20,211
| 9–7
|- style="background:#fcc;"
| 17
| November 29
| @ Oklahoma City
| 
| Stephen Curry (32)
| David Lee (12)
| Stephen Curry (5)
| Chesapeake Energy Arena18,203
| 9–8

|- style="background:#cfc;"
| 18
| December 1
| @ Sacramento
| 
| Stephen Curry (36)
| Andrew Bogut (12)
| Stephen Curry (10)
| Sleep Train Arena15,588
| 10–8
|- style="background:#cfc;"
| 19
| December 3
| Toronto
| 
| Stephen Curry (27)
| David Lee (8)
| Stephen Curry (10)
| Oracle Arena19,596
| 11–8
|- style="background:#fcc;"
| 20
| December 6
| @ Houston
| 
| Stephen Curry (22)
| Draymond Green (8)
| Stephen Curry (5)
| Toyota Center18,145
| 11–9
|- style="background:#cfc;"
| 21
| December 7
| @ Memphis
| 
| Klay Thompson (30)
| Andrew Bogut (12)
| Stephen Curry (15)
| FedExForum15,088
| 12–9
|- style="background:#fcc;"
| 22
| December 9
| @ Charlotte
| 
| Stephen Curry (43)
| David Lee (16)
| Stephen Curry (9)
| Time Warner Cable Arena13,129
| 12–10
|- style="background:#cfc;"
| 23
| December 11
| Dallas
| 
| Stephen Curry (33)
| Andrew Bogut (18)
| Stephen Curry (10)
| Oracle Arena19,596
| 13–10
|- style="background:#fcc;"
| 24
| December 13
| Houston
| 
| David Lee (23)
| Harrison Barnes (12)
| Stephen Curry (9)
| Oracle Arena19,596
| 13–11
|- style="background:#fcc;"
| 25
| December 15
| @ Phoenix
| 
| Stephen Curry (30)
| Andrew Bogut (14)
| Stephen Curry (7)
| US Airways Center14,393
| 13–12
|- style="background:#cfc;"
| 26
| December 17
| New Orleans
| 
| Stephen Curry (28)
| David Lee (17)
| Stephen Curry (12)
| Oracle Arena19,596
| 14–12
|- style="background:#fcc;"
| 27
| December 19
| San Antonio
| 
| David Lee (32)
| Andrew Bogut (18)
| Stephen Curry (15)
| Oracle Arena19,596
| 14–13
|- style="background:#cfc;"
| 28
| December 21
| L.A. Lakers
| 
| David Lee (19)
| Andrew Bogut (20)
| Stephen Curry (9)
| Oracle Arena19,596
| 15–13
|- style="background:#cfc;"
| 29
| December 23
| @ Denver
| 
| David Lee (28)
| Andrew Bogut (11)
| Stephen Curry (7)
| Pepsi Center18,551
| 16–13
|- style="background:#cfc;"
| 30
| December 25
| L.A. Clippers
| 
| David Lee (23)
| Andrew Bogut (14)
| Stephen Curry (11)
| Oracle Arena19,596
| 17–13
|- style="background:#cfc;"
| 31
| December 27
| Phoenix
| 
| Klay Thompson (21)
| Stephen Curry (13)
| Stephen Curry (16)
| Oracle Arena19,596
| 18-13
|- style="background:#cfc;"
| 32
| December 29
| @ Cleveland
| 
| Stephen Curry (29)
| Draymond Green (12)
| Stephen Curry (11)
| Quicken Loans Arena19,384
| 19-13
|- style="background:#cfc;"
| 33
| December 31
| @ Orlando
| 
| David Lee (22)
| Andrew Bogut (11)
| Stephen Curry (8)
| Amway Center15,062
| 20-13

|- style="background:#cfc;"
| 34
| January 2
| @ Miami
| 
| Stephen Curry (36)
| David Lee (14)
| Stephen Curry (12)
| American Airlines Arena20,350
| 21-13
|- style="background:#cfc;"
| 35
| January 3
| @ Atlanta
| 
| David Lee (23)
| Andrew Bogut (9)
| Stephen Curry (9)
| Philips Arena15,210
| 22-13
|- style="background:#cfc;"
| 36
| January 5
| @ Washington
| 
| Klay Thompson (26)
| Lee & Bogut (11)
| Stephen Curry (10)
| Verizon Center17,390
| 23-13
|- style="background:#cfc;"
| 37
| January 7
| @ Milwaukee
| 
| David Lee (22)
| David Lee (18)
| Stephen Curry (6)
| BMO Harris Bradley Center11,739
| 24-13
|- style="background:#fcc;"
| 38
| January 8
| @ Brooklyn
| 
| Stephen Curry (34)
| Andrew Bogut (9)
| Stephen Curry (7)
| Barclays Center17,732
| 24-14
|- style="background:#cfc;"
| 39
| January 10
| Boston
| 
| Andre Iguodala (22)
| Andrew Bogut (13)
| Andre Iguodala (7)
| Oracle Arena19,596
| 25-14
|- style="background:#fcc;"
| 40
| January 15
| Denver
| 
| David Lee (28)
| David Lee (11)
| Stephen Curry (7)
| Oracle Arena19,596
| 25-15
|- style="background:#fcc;"
| 41
| January 17
| @ Oklahoma City
| 
| Stephen Curry (37)
| David Lee (9)
| Stephen Curry (11)
| Chesapeake Energy Arena18,203
| 25-16
|- style="background:#cfc;"
| 42
| January 18
| @ New Orleans
| 
| Stephen Curry (28)
| Andrew Bogut (15)
| Stephen Curry (8)
| New Orleans Arena18,045
| 26-16
|- style="background:#fcc;"
| 43
| January 20
| Indiana
| 
| Stephen Curry (24)
| Andrew Bogut (13)
| Stephen Curry (9)
| Oracle Arena19,596
| 26-17
|- style="background:#fcc;"
| 44
| January 24
| Minnesota
| 
| Stephen Curry (33)
| Andrew Bogut (11)
| Stephen Curry (15)
| Oracle Arena19,596
| 26-18
|- style="background:#cfc;"
| 45
| January 26
| Portland
| 
| Stephen Curry (38)
| David Lee (12)
| Stephen Curry (8)
| Oracle Arena19,596
| 27-18
|- style="background:#fcc;"
| 46
| January 28
| Washington
| 
| Stephen Curry (23)
| Andrew Bogut (14)
| Curry & Thompson (4)
| Oracle Arena19,596
| 27-19
|- style="background:#cfc;"
| 47
| January 30
| L.A. Clippers
| 
| Curry & Lee (22)
| Andrew Bogut (17)
| Stephen Curry (7)
| Oracle Arena19,596
| 28-19
|- style="background:#cfc;"
| 48
| January 31
| @ Utah
| 
| Stephen Curry (44)
| Andrew Bogut (17)
| Andrew Bogut (5)
| EnergySolutions Arena19,911
| 29–19

|- style="background:#fcc;"
| 49
| February 4
| Charlotte
| 
| Stephen Curry (17)
| Andrew Bogut (15)
| Stephen Curry (11)
| Oracle Arena19,596
| 29-20
|- style="background:#cfc;"
| 50
| February 6
| Chicago
| 
| Stephen Curry (34)
| Andre Iguodala (8)
| Stephen Curry (9)
| Oracle Arena19,596
| 30-20
|- style="background:#fcc;"
| 51
| February 8
| @ Phoenix
| 
| Stephen Curry (28)
| Andre Iguodala (8)
| Stephen Curry (9)
| US Airways Center17,846
| 30-21
|- style="background:#cfc;"
| 52
| February 10
| Philadelphia
| 
| Marreese Speights (32)
| David Lee (13)
| Stephen Curry (8)
| Oracle Arena19,596
| 31-21
|- style="background:#fcc;"
| 53
| February 12
| Miami
| 
| Stephen Curry (29)
| David Lee (11)
| Stephen Curry (7)
| Oracle Arena19,596
| 31-22
|- align="center"
|colspan="9" bgcolor="#bbcaff"|All-Star Break
|- style="background:#cfc;"
| 54
| February 19
| @ Sacramento
| 
| David Lee (23)
| David Lee (11)
| Stephen Curry (8)
| Sleep Train Arena17,317
| 32-22
|- style="background:#cfc;"
| 55
| February 20
| Houston
| 
| David Lee (28)
| David Lee (14)
| Andre Iguodala (7)
| Oracle Arena19,596
| 33-22
|- style="background:#cfc;"
| 56
| February 22
| Brooklyn
| 
| Jermaine O'Neal (23)
| Jermaine O'Neal (13)
| Stephen Curry (8)
| Oracle Arena19,596
| 34-22
|- style="background:#cfc;"
| 57
| February 24
| @ Detroit
| 
| Curry & Thompson (19)
| Jermaine O'Neal (10)
| Stephen Curry (9)
| Palace of Auburn Hills14,071
| 35-22
|- style="background:#fcc;"
| 58
| February 26
| @ Chicago
| 
| Jordan Crawford (16)
| Andre Iguodala (7)
| Stephen Curry (5)
| United Center21,701
| 35-23
|- style="background:#cfc;"
| 59
| February 28
| @ New York
| 
| Stephen Curry (27)
| Stephen Curry (11)
| Stephen Curry (11)
| Madison Square Garden19,812
| 36-23

|- style="background:#fcc;"
| 60
| March 2
| @ Toronto
| 
| Stephen Curry (34)
| David Lee (11)
| Stephen Curry (7)
| Air Canada Centre18,658
| 36–24
|- style="background:#cfc;"
| 61
| March 4
| @ Indiana
| 
| Klay Thompson (25)
| Stephen Curry (8)
| Curry & Blake (6)
| Bankers Life Fieldhouse18,165
| 37-24
|- style="background:#cfc;"
| 62
| March 5
| @ Boston
| 
| Lee & Thompson (18)
| David Lee (10)
| Steve Blake (6)
| TD Garden18,155
| 38-24
|- style="background:#cfc;"
| 63
| March 7
| Atlanta
| 
| David Lee (18)
| Andrew Bogut (9)
| Stephen Curry (7)
| Oracle Arena19,596
| 39-24
|- style="background:#cfc;"
| 64
| March 9
| Phoenix
| 
| David Lee (26)
| David Lee (9)
| Stephen Curry (9)
| Oracle Arena19,596
| 40-24
|- style="background:#cfc;"
| 65
| March 11
| Dallas
| 
| Jordan Crawford (19)
| David Lee (11)
| Steve Blake (8)
| Oracle Arena19,596
| 41-24
|- style="background:#fcc;"
| 66
| March 12
| @ L.A. Clippers
| 
| Klay Thompson (26)
| David Lee (7)
| Stephen Curry (11)
| Staples Center19,570
| 41-25
|- style="background:#fcc;"
| 67
| March 14
| Cleveland
| 
| Stephen Curry (27)
| Andrew Bogut (12)
| Stephen Curry (8)
| Oracle Arena19,596
| 41-26
|- style="background:#cfc;"
| 68
| March 16
| @ Portland
| 
| Stephen Curry (37)
| Draymond Green (8)
| Stephen Curry (5)
| Moda Center20,063
| 42-26
|- style="background:#cfc;"
| 69
| March 18
| Orlando
| 
| Stephen Curry (23)
| David Lee (10)
| Stephen Curry (5)
| Oracle Arena19,596
| 43-26
|- style="background:#cfc;"
| 70
| March 20
| Milwaukee
| 
| Stephen Curry (31)
| Lee & Bogut (12)
| Stephen Curry (11)
| Oracle Arena19,596
| 44-26
|- style="background:#fcc;"
| 71
| March 22
| San Antonio
| 
| Stephen Curry (20)
| Andrew Bogut (17)
| Stephen Curry (6)
| Oracle Arena19,596
| 44-27
|- style="background:#cfc;"
| 72
| March 28
| Memphis
| 
| Stephen Curry (33)
| Draymond Green (9)
| Stephen Curry (8)
| Oracle Arena19,596
| 45-27
|- style="background:#fcc;"
| 73
| March 30
| New York
| 
| Stephen Curry (32)
| Jermaine O'Neal (12)
| Andre Iguodala (6)
| Oracle Arena19,596
| 45-28

|- style="background:#cfc;"
| 74
| April 1
| @ Dallas
| 
| Klay Thompson (27)
| Marreese Speights (9)
| Stephen Curry (10)
| American Airlines Center20,423
| 46-28
|- style="background:#fcc;"
| 75
| April 2
| @ San Antonio
| 
| Marreese Speights (22)
| Speights &  Armstrong (9)
| Stephen Curry (10)
| AT&T Center18,581
| 46-29
|- style="background:#cfc;"
| 76
| April 4
| Sacramento
| 
| Klay Thompson (21)
| Speights & Green (10)
| Stephen Curry (5)
| Oracle Arena19,596
| 47-29
|- style="background:#cfc;"
| 77
| April 6
| Utah
| 
| Klay Thompson (33)
| Andrew Bogut (11)
| Stephen Curry (16)
| Oracle Arena19,596
| 48-29
|- style="background:#fcc;"
| 78
| April 10
| Denver
| 
| Stephen Curry (24)
| Andrew Bogut (8)
| Stephen Curry (6)
| Oracle Arena19,596
| 48-30
|- style="background:#cfc;"
| 79
| April 11
| @ L.A. Lakers
| 
| Stephen Curry (30)
| Lee & Curry (10)
| Stephen Curry (12)
| Staples Center18,997
| 49-30
|- style="background:#fcc;"
| 80
| April 13
| @ Portland
| 
| Stephen Curry (47)
| Andrew Bogut (9)
| Stephen Curry (5)
| Moda Center19,995
| 49-31
|- style="background:#cfc;"
| 81
| April 14
| Minnesota
| 
| Stephen Curry (32)
| Draymond Green (12)
| Stephen Curry (15)
| Oracle Arena19,596
| 50-31
|- style="background:#cfc;"
| 82
| April 16
| @ Denver
| 
| Jordan Crawford (41)
| Hilton Armstrong (10)
| Steve Blake (15)
| Pepsi Center17,232
| 51-31

Playoffs

Game log

|- style="background:#cfc;"
| 1
| April 19
| @ L.A. Clippers
|  
| Klay Thompson (21)
| David Lee (13)
| Stephen Curry (7)
| Staples Center19,339
| 1–0
|- style="background:#fcc;"
| 2
| April 21
| @ L.A. Clippers
| 
| Stephen Curry (24)
| Speights, Barnes (6)
| Stephen Curry (8)
| Staples Center19,570
| 1–1
|- style="background:#fcc;"
| 3
| April 24
| L.A. Clippers
| 
| Klay Thompson (26)
| Draymond Green (11)
| Stephen Curry (15)
| Oracle Arena19,596
| 1–2
|- style="background:#cfc;"
| 4
| April 27
| L.A. Clippers
| 
| Stephen Curry (33)
| Stephen Curry (7)
| Andre Iguodala (9)
| Oracle Arena19,596
| 2–2
|- style="background:#fcc;"
| 5
| April 29
| @ L.A. Clippers
| 
| Klay Thompson (21)
| Draymond Green (11)
| Andre Iguodala (8)
| Staples Center19,657
| 2–3
|- style="background:#cfc;"
| 6
| May 1
| L.A. Clippers
| 
| Stephen Curry (24)
| Draymond Green (14)
| Stephen Curry (9)
| Oracle Arena19,596
| 3–3
|- style="background:#fcc;"
| 7
| May 3
| @ L.A. Clippers
| 
| Stephen Curry (33)
| David Lee (13)
| Stephen Curry (9)
| Staples Center19,543
| 3–4

Roster

Transactions

Trades

Free agency

Additions

Subtractions

References

Golden State Warriors seasons
Golden State Warriors
Golden
Golden